The Bewitched House (Spanish:La casa embrujada) is a 1949 Mexican mystery film directed by Fernando A. Rivero and starring David T. Bamberg and Katy Jurado. The film's sets were designed by the art director Luis Moya.

Cast
 David T. Bamberg as Fu Manchu  
 Mary Clark as Alicia  
 Carlos Martínez Baena as Inocente de los Ángeles  
 Alejandro Cobo as Manuel Beltrán  
 Alfonso Bedoya as Vendedor de palomas  
 Freddie Romero as Lucifer 
 José Elías Moreno as Nicanor  
 Ángel Di Stefani as Pitágoras  
 Enriqueta Reza as Angelita 
 Katy Jurado

References

Bibliography 
 Cotter, Bob. The Mexican Masked Wrestler and Monster Filmography. McFarland & Company, 2005.

External links 
 

1949 films
1949 mystery films
Mexican mystery films
1940s Spanish-language films

Mexican black-and-white films
1940s Mexican films